Paradise Hill is a town in the northwest corner of Sequoyah County, Oklahoma, United States. It is part of the Fort Smith, Arkansas-Oklahoma Metropolitan Statistical Area. The population was 85 at the 2010 census, a decline from the figure of 100 recorded in 2000.

History
Paradise Hill is a relatively new town, having originated in 1954 on the shore of Tenkiller Ferry Lake. There were 47 permanent homes by 1962. The town had already incorporated and owned its own water system. It more than doubled its physical size by 1969 by annexing adjacent land.

Geography
Paradise Hill is located at  (35.624009, -95.070563).

Demographics

As of the census of 2000, there were 100 people, 45 households, and 31 families residing in the town. The racial makeup of the town was 76.00% White, 6.00% Native American, 1.00% from other races, and 17.00% from two or more races. Hispanic or Latino of any race were 4.00% of the population.

There were 45 households, out of which 22.2% had children under the age of 18 living with them, 64.4% were married couples living together, 4.4% had a female householder with no husband present, and 31.1% were non-families. 28.9% of all households were made up of individuals, and 11.1% had someone living alone who was 65 years of age or older. The average household size was 2.22 and the average family size was 2.74.

In the town, the population was spread out, with 17.0% under the age of 18, 5.0% from 18 to 24, 22.0% from 25 to 44, 27.0% from 45 to 64, and 29.0% who were 65 years of age or older. The median age was 48 years. For every 100 females, there were 78.6 males. For every 100 females age 18 and over, there were 80.4 males.

The median income for a household in the town was $30,500, and the median income for a family was $38,125. Males had a median income of $43,333 versus $48,750 for females. The per capita income for the town was $22,835. There were 8.0% of families and 12.4% of the population living below the poverty line, including no under eighteens and 7.4% of those over 64.

References

Towns in Sequoyah County, Oklahoma
Towns in Oklahoma
Fort Smith metropolitan area